Atwood is an unincorporated community located in southern Franklin County, Alabama, United States. It is located along Alabama Highway 172 between the towns of Hodges and Vina. Atwood is situated just south of the Bear Creek Reservoir.

History
Atwood was named after Abner Atwood, a local physician. A post office was established in the town in 1898, but was later closed.

References

Unincorporated communities in Alabama
Unincorporated communities in Franklin County, Alabama
Populated places established in 1898